The Canadian International College (CIC) (transliteration: Al Ma'haad Al Canadie Alaaly), is an Egyptian Higher institute in Cairo, Egypt. The CIC is the sole provider of Canadian higher education in Egypt. CIC is the Cairo campus for Cape Breton University. It has two campuses, the main campus is located in the residential area of El Tagamoa El Khames in New Cairo city and the other campus is located in El Sheikh Zayed.

The institute offers two types of programs, an Egyptian program in which Students gain the Egyptian bachelor's degree accredited from both the Supreme Council of Universities and the Ministry of Higher Education, and the Dual program where students earn both the Egyptian bachelor's degree accredited from the Supreme Council of Universities and the Ministry of Higher Education, and the Canadian bachelor's degree from Cape Breton University according to the Field of Study.

Canadian International College offers its students the opportunity to travel and study in Canada for one semester, one full year through its Exchange programs with Cape Breton University in Nova Scotia, Canada or to transfer and continue their studies completely through the Transfer program.

See also
 List of Egyptian universities
 American University in Cairo
 British University in Egypt
 Université Française d'Égypte

References

External links
 Canadian International College website
 CBU website

Education in Cairo
Universities in Egypt
Educational institutions established in 2004
2004 establishments in Egypt